KRUZ (103.3 FM, "KRUZ 103.3") is a commercial radio station that is licensed to Santa Barbara, California and broadcasts a classic hits radio format throughout Santa Barbara, Ventura, and San Luis Obispo counties. The station is owned by Cumulus Media and has its studios in Ventura. 

KRUZ has an effective radiated power (ERP) of 105,000 watts. These factors give KRUZ one of the largest coverage areas of any FM station in the United States. KRUZ broadcasts in analog only, not airing a digital HD Radio. However, on February 16, 2021, the station began to carry RDS information.

History

KMUZ (1961–1971)
The station first signed on April 18, 1961 as KMUZ with a beautiful music format. It was originally owned by William H. Buckley, doing business as Tri-Counties Communications Inc.

KRUZ First Generation (1972–2005)
On June 18, 1970, Tri-Counties Communications sold KMUZ to The Schuele Organization Inc. for $106,500. Carl Schuele, principal of the latter group, previously was owner and president of Broadcast Time Sales, a radio station consulting firm. The new owner changed the call letters to KRUZ two years later. The Schuele Organization owned KRUZ for nearly a quarter century, selling it in October 1995 to Pacific Coast Communications Inc. for $3 million. The easy listening format gradually transitioned to adult contemporary (AC), and the station adopted a hot AC format full-time in 1996.

In December 1999, Pacific Coast Communications sold KRUZ to Cumulus Media for $10 million. This transaction, combined with a concurrent purchase of McDonald Media Group's eight stations, marked Cumulus' debut on the West Coast.

KVYB (2005–2019)
In March 2005, Cumulus Media shuffled the formats of the stations within its Santa Barbara cluster. KRUZ's hot AC format moved to 97.5 FM, a frequency then occupied by smooth jazz station KMGQ, with the KRUZ call letters soon to follow. This paved the way for the launch of KVYB (103.3 The Vibe), the Santa Barbara market's first Hispanic-targeted rhythmic contemporary outlet. KVYB also marked the return of top 40 radio to the area after KIST-FM flipped to modern rock in 2003.

Initially, KVYB's musical direction had featured Hispanic rhythmic artists as well as bilingual on-air personalities. The Vibe's first slogan "Hip Hop Y Mas" reflected the station's multicultural flavor. Among the DJs hired to launch KVYB are Jaime "Rico" Rangel and Daniel "Mambo" Herrejon, two Latino men who hosted the morning show at rhythmic contemporary competitor KCAQ (Q104.7) in Ventura. While at KCAQ, the duo took the station to number one in the Arbitron ratings in the Oxnard—Ventura market. They left in 2005 and brought The Rico and Mambo Show to KYVB, with Herrejon doubling as the new station's first programming director.

In 2008, 103.3 The Vibe adjusted its format to a conventional rhythmic top 40 presentation. Rangel and Herrejon were dismissed June 13; they returned to KCAQ the following year.

KRUZ (2019–present)
On June 28, 2019, KVYB changed its call letters back to KRUZ in preparation for a format flip. The following day, KRUZ began stunting with clips of 1980s events, movies, video games, and songs. Teasing the return of the KRUZ call letters, the montage announced that a new format would surface July 1 at 8 a.m., using snippets of such songs as "Cruisin'" by Smokey Robinson, "1985" by Bowling for Soup, and "California Love" by 2Pac. The Vibe moved to 106.3 FM, replacing the classic hip hop format on that frequency and adjusting its own presentation from rhythmic contemporary to mainstream top 40. On July 1, 2019 at 8 a.m., KRUZ ended stunting and launched a classic hits format as "KRUZ 103.3", with the first song played being "Footloose" by Kenny Loggins.

Signal coverage
KRUZ's signal blankets the Coastal California counties of Santa Barbara, Ventura, and San Luis Obispo. It can also be heard in parts of Los Angeles and Kern counties, as far north as San Lucas, and occasionally as far south as San Diego County. This is due to the station's 105,000-watt signal and  antenna (HAAT). This configuration was grandfathered in when the Federal Communications Commission established limits on effective radiated power in 1962.

References

External links
FCC History Cards for KRUZ 

Classic hits radio stations in the United States
RUZ (FM)
Radio stations established in 1961
1961 establishments in California
Cumulus Media radio stations